Act of Denial is an international melodic death metal supergroup, formed in 2020. Its members are vocalist Bjorn Strid (Soilwork), guitarists, songwriter and producer Voi Cox (Koziak, Victim) and lyricist and guitarist Luger (Benighted, Koziak), bassist Steve Di Giorgio (Death, Testament), drummer Kerim Lechner (Septicflesh) and keyboardist John Lönnmyr (The Night Flight Orchestra).

The band's debut album, Negative, was released on August 13, 2021, and was preceded by five singles "Puzzle Heart", "Controlled", "Down That Line", "Slave" and "Your Dark Desires". The album features guest appearances from Ron "Bumblefoot" Thal (Guns N' Roses, Sons of Apollo), Mattias IA Eklundh (Freak Kitchen), Bobby Koelble (Death) and Peter Wichers (Soilwork, Warrel Dane).

As of March 2022, a second album by Act of Denial is in the works.

Discography

Albums
 Negative (2021)

Singles
 "Puzzle Heart" (2020)
 "Controlled" (2020)
 "Down That Line" (2020)
 "Slave" (2021)
 "Your Dark Desires" (2021)

References

Musical quartets
Musical groups established in 2020
Heavy metal supergroups